Subunit beta of interleukin 12 (also known as IL-12B, natural killer cell stimulatory factor 2, cytotoxic lymphocyte maturation factor p40, or interleukin-12 subunit p40) is a protein subunit that in humans is encoded by the IL12B gene. IL-12B is a common subunit of interleukin 12 and  interleukin 23.

Function 

This gene encodes a subunit of interleukin 12, a cytokine that acts on T and natural killer cells, and has a broad array of biological activities. Interleukin 12 is a disulfide-linked heterodimer composed of the 40 kDa cytokine receptor like subunit encoded by this gene, and a 35 kDa subunit encoded by IL12A. This cytokine is expressed by activated macrophages that serve as an essential inducer of Th1 cells development. This cytokine has been found to be important for sustaining a sufficient number of memory/effector Th1 cells to mediate long-term protection to an intracellular pathogen. Overexpression of this gene was observed in the central nervous system of patients with multiple sclerosis (MS), suggesting a role of this cytokine in the pathogenesis of the disease. The promoter polymorphism of this gene has been reported to be associated with the severity of atopic and non-atopic asthma in children.

Role as IL-23 subunit 

Interleukin-12 p40 also serves as a subunit of interleukin 23.

References

Further reading

Human proteins
Interleukins